Rewben Mashangva, also Guru Rewben Mashangva (born June 21, 1961), is a folk musician and singer from Manipur, India.  He is known for reviving musical tradition of the Tangkhul Naga of Manipur, and use of traditional musical instruments in his songs. Influenced by musicians such as Bob Dylan and  Bob Marley, Rewben Mashangva has created many Naga tribal folk songs based on blues and ballad rhythms. He is known by different names including, 'Bob Dylan of the Nagas' and 'King of Naga folk blues', plus 'Father of Naga folk blues'. He received the National Tribal Award 2011-12, for his contribution to the development of tribal music from the Ministry of Tribal Affairs, Government of India. The Government of India honoured him in 2021, with the award of Padma Shri, the fourth highest Indian civilian award for his rich contribution to art.

Mashangva was featured in the first season of The Dewarists, along with The Raghu Dixit Project.

Discography
 Tantivy (1999)
 Creation (2006)
 Our Story (2012)

References

Musicians from Manipur
Indian folk musicians
1961 births
People from Ukhrul district
Country blues musicians
Living people
20th-century Indian musicians
Naga people
Indian male singer-songwriters
Indian singer-songwriters
20th-century Indian male singers
20th-century Indian singers
Recipients of the Padma Shri in arts